William Friedberg (April 22, 1915 - April 7, 1965) was an American producer and screenwriter.

Friedberg started his career in 1950 writing for All Star Revue. In 1951 he appeared in the broadway play Two on the Aisle. He also wrote an episode of The Colgate Comedy Hour with screenwriter Nat Hiken. He later wrote for 43 episodes of Hiken's comedy series The Phil Silvers Show. Friedberg’s writing credits also include The Jackie Gleason Show, Car 54, Where Are You? and Peter Loves Mary. In 1957, he won a Primetime Emmy for Best Comedy Writing - Variety or Situation Comedy.

Friedberg died in April 1965 of a heart attack in Los Angeles, California, at the age of 49.

References

External links 

1915 births
1965 deaths
American screenwriters
American television producers
American television writers
American male television writers
American male screenwriters
People from New York (state)
20th-century American screenwriters
Columbia University alumni